Lütfi Müfit Özdeş (1874 in Kırşehir – April 18, 1940 in Heybeliada) was a military officer of the Ottoman Army, and a politician of the Republic of Turkey. He was one of the founding members of Vatan ve Hürriyet. In 1925 he was appointed a member of the Independence Tribunal in Diyarbakır, which was established the counter the Sheikh Said rebellion and sentenced Sheikh Said to death.

Sources

1874 births
1940 deaths
People from Kırşehir
Ottoman Military Academy alumni
Ottoman Army officers
Ottoman military personnel of the Balkan Wars
Ottoman military personnel of World War I
Republican People's Party (Turkey) politicians
Turkish military personnel of the Greco-Turkish War (1919–1922)
Recipients of the Medal of Independence with Red Ribbon (Turkey)
Deputies of Kırşehir
Sheikh Said rebellion